Wangui is a middle name of Kikuyu origin. Notable people with the surname include:

 Lucy Wangui Kabuu (born 1984), Kenyan long-distance runner
 Rose Wangui, Kenyan journalist
 Pascaline Wangui (born 1960), Kenyan marathon runner

Surnames of Kenyan origin